The Smoking Hills are located on the east coast of Cape Bathurst in Canada's Northwest Territories, next to the Arctic Ocean and a small group of lakes. The cliffs were named by explorer John Franklin, who was the first European to see them on his 1826 expeditions. They contain strata of hydrocarbons (oil shales), which have been burning continuously for centuries.

The fires result from autoignition of sulfur-rich lignite deposits. The clouds of smoke have given the region its name.  Over time the sulfur dioxide from the smoke has acidified the shallow ponds (<  area and <  depth) in the tundra dotting the area, down to a pH lower than 2. Elevated concentrations of metals (aluminium, iron, zinc, nickel, manganese and cadmium) occur in these acidic ponds. Soils and sediments have also been chemically altered. The acidic biota in the ponds are characteristic of acidic environments worldwide, in contrast to the typically Arctic biota in adjacent alkaline ponds. Although the soil of the region contains much limestone, the buffer effect has completely disappeared.

Weathering of the coastline of the area leads to the continuous exposure of new mineral deposits from the muds that make up the underlying geology. These are typically colored red when iron-rich.

See also 
 Brennender Berg
 Burning Mountain
 Centralia mine fire
 New Straitsville mine fire

References

External links and further reading

Landforms of the Northwest Territories
Cliffs of Canada
Persistent natural fires
Geotopes